Jonathan Strange & Mr Norrell is a seven-part British historical fantasy TV miniseries adapted by Peter Harness from Susanna Clarke's best-selling 2004 novel of the same name. It premiered on BBC One on 17 May 2015 and ended on 28 June 2015. It was nominated for four BAFTA awards and recognised by the British Film Institute as one of the top ten most important television programmes of 2015.

Plot
Set in England during the Napoleonic Wars at the beginning of the 19th century, the series presents an alternative history where magic is widely acknowledged, but rarely practised. Living in the rural north, Mr Norrell (Eddie Marsan) of Hurtfew Abbey is able to make the statues of York Minster talk and move. His manservant John Childermass (Enzo Cilenti) persuades him to travel to London to help in the war against France.

While there, Mr Norrell encounters a leading member of the government and makes magic respectable in the realm when he conjures a fairy, called the Gentleman (Marc Warren), to bring the minister's fiancée (Alice Englert) back to life. Meanwhile, Jonathan Strange (Bertie Carvel) meets Vinculus (Paul Kaye), a street magician, while attempting to find a respectable profession, as demanded by his love Arabella (Charlotte Riley). Strange is told by Vinculus that he is destined to be a great magician and so he begins to study magic.

Cast
 Bertie Carvel as Jonathan Strange
 Eddie Marsan as Gilbert Norrell
 Marc Warren as The Gentleman
 Charlotte Riley as Arabella Strange
 Alice Englert as Lady Emma Pole
 Samuel West as Sir Walter Pole
 Enzo Cilenti as John Childermass
 Paul Kaye as Vinculus
 Edward Hogg as John Segundus
 Ariyon Bakare as Stephen Black
 Vincent Franklin as Christopher Drawlight
 John Heffernan as Henry Lascelles
 Brian Pettifer as Mr Honeyfoot
 Robbie O'Neill as Lucas
 Richard Durden as Lord Liverpool
 Freddie Hogan as Davey
 Claudia Jessie as Mary
 Ronan Vibert as Lord Wellington
 Steve Jackson as Jeremy Johns
 Jamie Parker as Grant
 Phoebe Nicholls as Mrs Wintertowne
 Clive Mantle as Dr Greysteel
 Lucinda Dryzek as Flora Greysteel
 Niall Greig Fulton as The Raven King

Episodes

Production

Development

On 30 November 2012, the BBC announced that an adaptation of Jonathan Strange & Mr Norrell had been commissioned for BBC One. The production was officially greenlit as a seven-hour miniseries in April 2013, with a projected 2014 premiere date. BBC America noted that it would broadcast the miniseries during its "Supernatural Saturday" science fiction and fantasy programming block.

Adapted by Harness and directed by Toby Haynes, the series was produced by Nick Hirschkorn, with executive producers Nick Marston, Tally Garner, Dixie Linder, Justin Thomson-Glover, Patrick Irwin and Matthew Read. Co-production credits are shared by Cuba Pictures and BBC America, Feel Films, Far Moor, Screen Yorkshire and Space.

Co-Production Countries were Canada (20.42%) United Kingdom (79.58%) and shot in Canada, the UK, and Croatia.

Casting
The BBC announced the casting of Carvel and Marsan in the title roles in October 2013, as well as Warren as The Gentleman, Riley as Arabella, West and Englert as Sir Walter and Lady Pole, Cilenti as Childermass and Kaye as Vinculus. A read-through of the script took place on 23 October 2013. Filming began on 28 October 2013 in Yorkshire, Canada and Croatia. Author Clarke visited the set in November 2013.

Broadcast
The series premiered in the UK on 17 May 2015. It later debuted in the US on BBC America on 13 June 2015, in Canada on The Movie Network and Movie Central on 3 July 2015, and in Australia on BBC First on 6 August 2015.

Reception
Jonathan Strange & Mr Norrell was positively received by critics. It holds an overall 91% "fresh" rating on Rotten Tomatoes and a critics' rating of 71/100 on Metacritic. It was selected for preservation in the BFI National Archive as one of the ten best TV programmes of 2015, as well as being nominated for four BAFTA Awards and seven RTS Yorkshire awards.

Evan Ferguson of The Observer wrote that you could describe it as "Harry Potter for adults" but that it was "far snakier and more thrilling" and likened it more to Peter Shaffer's Amadeus: "It’s in the Sunday-night slot lately reserved for Poldark. And it’s 10 times better." Nick Horton was even more enthusiastic in his Den of Geek review: "What are some of the best British dramas of recent years? Here’s just a few. Wolf Hall, Utopia, Peaky Blinders, Broadchurch, Happy Valley, Luther, Doctor Who and In The Flesh. It's been said to death but remains the case: we truly are in a golden age of original British drama. But now you might just have to make room for a new favourite. I don’t think it’s hyperbolic to say that Jonathan Strange & Mr Norrell is the finest new drama that’s been on our screens this decade. In fact, if the first two episodes are anything to go by, it could go down as one of the best this century."While Louisa Mellor added that Jonathan Strange & Mr Norrell "has that rare power to engulf" making it:"...ideal for swallowing in a single gulp. Watched back-to-back, its chapters coalesce into one marvellous, unbroken tale. It’s a bedtime story with tremendous scope; one that will transport you from Yorkshire to London to a Belgian battlefield to Venice, the other realm of Faerie and beyond."David Wiegand of the San Francisco Chronicle wrote that viewers would be "dazzled" by the series, calling the special effects "exquisitely executed" and noting that "Every performance is a winner, from Marsan’s mousey Norrell, to Carvel’s brash Jonathan, to Englert’s increasingly mad and self-destructive Lady Pole." Emmet Asher-Perrin praised the overall series at Tor.com but noted, "the ending of this series was altogether abrupt and unsatisfying for my tastes". Mike Hale of The New York Times called it "a largely unremarkable mini-series", adding: George R. R. Martin wrote in his Livejournal about popular novels and their adaptations: "I saw the BBC production of Jonathan Strange & Mr Norrell before I finally got around to reading Susanna Clarke's novel. In both cases, I loved the book and I loved the adaptation. It does not need to be one or the other. You might prefer one over the other, but you can still enjoy the hell out of both."

References

External links
 
 
 

2010s British drama television series
2015 British television series debuts
2015 British television series endings
BBC television dramas
2010s British television miniseries
English-language television shows
Films with screenplays by Peter Harness
Television shows based on British novels
Television series set in the 1800s
Television series set in the 1810s
Television shows set in the United Kingdom
Cultural depictions of Arthur Wellesley, 1st Duke of Wellington
British fantasy television series
BBC television miniseries
Television episodes directed by Toby Haynes